The 2022 Chinese Women's Football Championship was the 31st edition of the Chinese Women's Football Championship. It was held from 12 to 25 March 2022 at Haigeng Football Base in Kunming.

First round

Group A

Group B

Group C

Group D

Group E

Final round

1–8th classification playoffs

Quarter-finals

5th–8th-place play-offs

Semi-finals

7th–8th-place play-offs

5th–6th-place play-offs

3rd–4th-place play-offs

Final

9–16th classification playoffs

9th–16th-place play-offs

13th–16th-place play-offs

9th–12th-place play-offs

15th–16th-place play-offs

13th–14th-place play-offs

11th–12th-place play-offs

9th–10th-place play-offs

Notes

References

2022 in Chinese football